Mujib Riduan (born July 15, 1983) is an Indonesian footballer that currently plays for Pusamania Borneo F.C. in the Liga Indonesia Premier Division.

References

External links
 

1983 births
Association football defenders
Living people
Indonesian footballers
Liga 1 (Indonesia) players
Deltras F.C. players
Gresik United players
Indonesian Premier Division players
Mitra Kukar players
Borneo F.C. players